James Kirkpatrick (1903 – after 1926) was a Scottish professional footballer who played in the English Football League for Leeds United and Watford.

References

 

Scottish footballers
Watford F.C. players
Leeds United F.C. players
English Football League players
1903 births
Year of death missing
People from Annan, Dumfries and Galloway
Association football defenders
Date of birth missing
Queen of the South F.C. players
Workington A.F.C. players
Solway Star F.C. players